Pilocrocis reniferalis is a moth in the family Crambidae. It was described by George Hampson in 1912. It is found in Jamaica.

The wingspan is about 34 mm. The forewings are brown with a cupreous gloss. There is an indistinct oblique diffused antemedial line and a faint spot in the middle of the cell, as well as a faint discoidal reniform spot defined by fuscous. There is an indistinct diffused postmedial line. The hindwings are brown with a cupreous gloss and with a faint oblique discoidal striga and a very indistinct postmedial line.

References

Pilocrocis
Moths described in 1912
Moths of the Caribbean